The Revue Politique et Parlementaire is a quarterly French journal that discusses political issues, founded in 1894 by Marcel Fournier.

History

The journal was founded by Marcel Fournier, a professor of law and moderate liberal, with the help of partners such as Pierre Waldeck-Rousseau.
The first issue appeared in July 1894.
The stated objective was to become "a safe and prudent guide for the elected representatives of universal suffrage and the cadres of democracy".
Fournier wanted to discuss questions debated in parliament in more depth, and disseminate the views of specialists to the politicians.
The journal was published in Paris and appeared monthly.
Although the main focus was on parliamentary, legislative, and political matters, it also discussed economic and social questions. 
It gave a summary of political and parliamentary life in countries other than France.

In 1897 Fournier was made a Knight of the Legion of Honour.
The former deputy and future senator Fernand Faure became director of the journal from 1901.
He held this position until 1911.
In the early 1900s the journal published the competing views of Ferdinand Buisson, Charles Dupuy and René Goblet on the role of the church in education.
In 1910 Faure published articles in the journal on counting civil servants in France and the other main European countries.

In 1924 Paul Gueriot wrote in the journal on the two main positions in the debate over labour and immigration, a pressing issue given the labour shortage following World War I.
The one group held that workers were a form of "human capital", and could be imported as needed, while the other held that humans were more than mere animals, and "the foreigner brings us a mentality different from our own, which cannot be fused with ours."
From 1932 the supplement Le Bilan économique et financier de la France et de l'étranger (Economic and Financial Review of France and Abroad) was included in the journal.

Georges Putot (1900–89), a political economist who taught at the School for Advanced Studies in the Social Sciences from 1927 and became president of that school in 1965, edited the journal from 1957 to 1961.
In 1980 Guy Planadevall was director and Mario Guastoni was editor-in-chief.
The journal appeared bimonthly from July/August 1985, and then quarterly starting in 2004.
The journal, like others, has tended to focus on presidential and legislative elections, and has paid less attention to local elections.
However, it did publish a special issue on the local elections of 2010.

Contributors

Over the years contributors have included Charles de Gaulle, who gave his ideas on a professional mechanized army in the 1930s, Raymond Poincaré, Paul Doumer, Vincent Auriol, Edgar Faure, Pierre Mendès France, Raymond Aron, Georges Pompidou, Valéry Giscard d'Estaing, François Mitterrand, Jacques Chirac, Lionel Jospin and François Hollande.

Notes

Sources

External links

Quarterly magazines published in France
1894 establishments in France